MKC may refer to:

 Charles B. Wheeler Downtown Airport, serving Kansas City, Missouri (IATA airport code)
 Maksi railway station (Indian Railways code)
 McCormick & Company (NYSE ticker symbol)
 Meserete Kristos Church, an Ethiopian Anabaptist denomination
 Milton Keynes Central railway station (UK National Rail station code)
 Lincoln MKC, Lincoln automobile
 MKC Networks, a Canadian VoIP company
 Mortal Kombat: Conquest, a television show based on the video game Mortal Kombat
 Chief Machinery Technician, a rating in the US Coast Guard